Eubranchus glacialis is a species of sea slug or nudibranch, a marine gastropod mollusc in the family Eubranchidae.

Distribution
This species was described from the Gauss-Station, Davis Sea, Antarctica. It has been reported from McMurdo Sound.

References

Eubranchidae
Gastropods described in 1912